Laelia gloriosa is a species of orchid native to tropical South America.

References 

gloriosa
Orchids of South America